New York Minute is a 2004 American teen comedy film directed by Dennie Gordon and starring Mary-Kate Olsen, Ashley Olsen, and Eugene Levy, with Andy Richter, Jared Padalecki, Riley Smith, and Andrea Martin in supporting roles. In the film, Mary-Kate and Ashley portray twins with opposing personalities who have a series of adventures around New York City. The film reunited the Olsens with Bob Saget (in a non-speaking cameo) since they all starred together on the television series Full House (1987–1995).

It was released on May 7, 2004, by Warner Bros. Pictures, marking the Olsen twins' second theatrical film release after It Takes Two (1995), after years of starring in direct-to-video and television film productions. Consequently, it was the last film featuring both Mary-Kate and Ashley to date, as the former went on to appear in her own acting projects while the latter quit acting shortly after the film's release. This was also the last film to be produced by the Olsens' Dualstar Entertainment company before it went into dormancy. The film received generally negative reviews from critics and was a box office bomb, however, several publications have since re-evaluated the film as a cult classic in the years after its initial release.

Plot
Seventeen-year-old twin sisters Jane, an uptight overachiever, and Roxy Ryan, a rebellious, aspiring rock star, are polar opposites and never see eye to eye after their mother’s death. They live with their widower father in Syosset, a suburban Long Island town. The two journey into New York City so Jane can deliver a speech for a prestigious college scholarship and Roxy can hand her band's demo tape to Simple Plan, who are in town to shoot a music video.

Jane and Roxy board the train into New York but are thrown off after Roxy is found without a ticket. Jane flirts with Jim, and a chip device is mistakenly planted in Roxy's bag. Bennie Bang, the man behind the device, offers Roxy a limousine ride, and she accepts, dragging Jane along. He locks them inside, but they escape through the sunroof into the subway. Meanwhile, Max Lomax, an overzealous truant officer, is on the hunt for Roxy.

Jane realizes she has left her day planner in the limo, which has money and the prompt cards for her speech. She and Roxy break into an upscale hotel room to freshen up, where they receive a phone call from Bennie who offers to exchange the chip for the day planner. They meet Trey, the son of a powerful senator staying at the hotel, and his dog, Reinaldo, who swallows the chip.

Roxy heads to the Simple Plan video shoot, Max on her tail, while Jane meets Bennie for the exchange. When he learns the dog has swallowed the chip, he tries to attack Jane, who goes to find Roxy, and kidnaps Trey. Jane, Roxy, and Reinaldo end up in the underground sewer, with Jane's speech due to begin in less than two hours.

The girls make their way to a Harlem beauty salon, where they receive makeovers, although Max hunts them down and they escape in a cab and later argue. Jane feels that Roxy has never been there for her and never takes life seriously, leaving Jane in charge after their mother's death. Conversely, Roxy believes Jane does not need to take control of everything and feels she is being pushed away.

Jane goes to meet Bennie, who takes her to his mother, the head of a DVD and CD pirating operation. Roxy finds Bennie's limo, retrieves Jane's day planner, and frees Trey, who is locked in the trunk. They both rush to the building where Jane will give her speech. When they arrive, Roxy poses as Jane so she can give the speech, but drops the prompt cards and has to ad lib. Jane turns up and explains why she was not there. Suddenly, Max and Bennie arrive, Bennie's illegal doings are exposed, and he is arrested by Max.

As Jane leaves with Roxy, one of the judges catches up to Jane after finding her prompt cards and gives her a college scholarship to Oxford, because she "didn't just want to win, she absolutely refused to fail." Months later, Roxy is in the studio recording with the band, watched by Jane, Trey, Jim, and even Max (now an official police officer) as they celebrate all together.

Cast

Critical response 
On review aggregator website Rotten Tomatoes the film holds an approval rating of 11% based on 119 reviews, with an average rating of 3.8/10. The site's critics' consensus reads: "Feels more like a calculated product designed to expand the Olsens' brand than an actual movie. Also, it contains ethnic stereotyping and sexual innuendo." At Metacritic the film has a weighted average score of 33 out of 100, based on 32 critics, indicating "generally unfavorable reviews". Audiences polled by CinemaScore gave the film an average grade of "B" on an A+ to F scale. 

Roger Ebert and Richard Roeper gave the film a "two thumbs down" on the television show Ebert & Roeper; in selecting the film as one of the worst of 2004, Ebert remarked that the film "not only should have gone straight to video but should have gone straight through video and kept on going to the end of the universe and never looked back." He added: "New York Minute was obviously generated entirely as a vehicle for the Olsen twins, but what kind of a vehicle has no idea where to go, or what to do when it gets there? This movie should have put on the brakes."

Box office
New York Minute earned $5.96 million in its North American opening weekend, finishing in fourth place behind Van Helsing, Mean Girls, and Man on Fire, setting a record-low for a film playing in over 3,000 theatres. The film went on to gross $14.1 million in North America, and $7.2 million internationally, for a worldwide gross of $21.3 million.

Accolades

References

External links
 
 
 
 

2004 films
2004 comedy films
2000s teen comedy films
American teen comedy films
2000s English-language films
Films about twin sisters
Films directed by Dennie Gordon
Films produced by Denise Di Novi
Films scored by George S. Clinton
Films set in New York City
Films set in Columbia University
Films shot in New York City
Films shot in Toronto
Warner Bros. films
2000s American films